Antonio "Tony" Garcia (born December 10, 1993) is an American gridiron football offensive tackle for the DC Defenders of the XFL. He was drafted by the New England Patriots in the third round of the 2017 NFL Draft. He played college football for the Troy Trojans.

Professional career

New England Patriots
Garcia was drafted by the New England Patriots in the third round, 85th overall, in the 2017 NFL Draft. After leaving an August 9, 2017, training camp practice early, Garcia did not return to practice and did not play in any preseason game. On September 2, Garcia was placed on the reserve/non-football illness (NFI) list. In March 2018 it was revealed that Garcia had developed blood clots in his lungs; the resulting inability to practice led his weight to drop by at least 40 pounds.

On May 11, 2018, Garcia was released by the Patriots.

New York Jets
On May 14, 2018, Garcia was claimed off waivers by the New York Jets. He was waived on August 31, 2018.

Indianapolis Colts
On October 29, 2018, Garcia was signed to the Indianapolis Colts practice squad. He signed a reserve/future contract on January 13, 2019.

Garcia was suspended the first four games of the 2019 season for violating the league’s performance-enhancing substance policy. He was waived on August 31, 2019. He was reinstated from suspension on October 1, 2019, while still a free agent.

Miami Dolphins
On October 7, 2019, Garcia was signed to the Miami Dolphins practice squad. He was released on October 21, 2019.

Garcia had a tryout with the Las Vegas Raiders on August 23, 2020.

Saskatchewan Roughriders
On February 2, 2021, Garcia signed with the Saskatchewan Roughriders.

Vegas Vipers
Garcia was selected by the Vegas Vipers in the 2023 XFL Draft.

DC Defenders
Garcia was traded to the DC Defenders by the Vipers on March 6, 2023.

References

External links
 Troy Trojans profile

1993 births
Living people
American football offensive tackles
DC Defenders players
Edmonton Elks players
Indianapolis Colts players
Miami Dolphins players
New England Patriots players
New York Jets players
Players of American football from Atlanta
Players of American football from Houston
Players of Canadian football from Houston
Saskatchewan Roughriders players
Troy Trojans football players
Vegas Vipers players